The Fellowship of Independent Reformed Evangelicals (FIRE) is a Reformed Baptist network of churches founded in 2000. There are congregations in the United States and abroad. FIRE is a network of churches, not an organization. It provides a platform for fellowship, cooperation, and mission sending. All ministry, cooperation, missions, and meetings are at the initiative of member churches.

Doctrine 
The Denomination adheres to the Second London Baptist Confession of Faith 1689 and the London Confession of Faith 1644 and also affirm the Solas of the Reformation:
 Sola Scriptura - Scripture Alone
 Sola Fide - Faith Alone
 Soli Deo Gloria - the Glory of God Alone
 Solus Christus - Christ Alone
 Sola Gratia - Grace Alone 

A church elder in the denomination's Campbelltown, Pennsylvania church described his church as "very traditionally-minded", and as "going back to basics and returning to what a traditional church is".

Members 
FIRE consists of over 80 churches in the United States and internationally in Brazil, Canada, Spain, West Indies, Israel, Italy, India and Mauritius. While voting membership is restricted to churches, individuals also participate in this network of churches through a provision for individual membership.

Missions 
Member churches sponsor missionaries in the Philippines, Spain, France, Mexico, Montenegro, South Africa, Israel, Mozambique, Ireland.

External links

References 

Reformed Baptists denominations
Christian organizations established in 2000
2000 establishments in the United States